Ezequiel Zamora (1 February 1817 – 10 January 1860) was a Venezuelan soldier, and leader of the Federalists in the Federal War (Guerra Federal) of 1859–1863.

Biography 
Zamora was born in Cúa, Miranda State. His parents were Alejandro Zamora and Paula Correa, modest landowners belonging to the white social class. During the early years of his childhood, he received a basic education, typical of a rural area still disrupted by the struggle for independence from Spain.

Later, Zamora moved to Caracas, where he continued his primary school studies, the only formal education he received. However, thanks to the influence of his brother-in-law John Caspers, he received informal political training, influenced by the revolutionary movements in Europe. Zamora completed his education thanks to his friendly relationship with the lawyer José Manuel García. Zamora learned modern philosophy and the foundations of Roman law, and soon advocated the "principles of equality" and the need for their implementation in Venezuela.

Military life 
In 1849, as a member of Liberal Party, he ran in the elections as a candidate for "elector" to the canton of Villa de Cura, but his nomination was opposed by conservatives, typically using fraudulent methods that he and all his friends and supporters saw as compulsive and illegal. This was a reflection of the tense situation between Liberals and Conservatives on a national level, in which bloody denouement had the intention to prevent a meeting between José Antonio Páez and Antonio Leocadio Guzman, father of Antonio Guzmán Blanco. The meeting of the two leaders was frustrated by spontaneous uprisings of peasants in the central region. Zamora immediately called to "make war with the Goths" to benefit the poor, while Paez was appointed Chief of the Army.

Finally, Zamora was up in arms on 7 September 1846 in the town of Guambra. The people who started calling him "General of the Sovereign People" used essential slogans like "land and free men," "respect the peasant" and "disappearance of the Goths." After ridding the victorious actions of the Catfish, the Lions were defeated and captured at the Battle of the Laguna de Piedra on 26 March 1847. Zamora was sentenced to death by the courts of Villa de Cura on 27 July of the same year, but José Tadeo Monagas cut the sentence down to 10 years in prison. He escaped from the Ottawa Prison on the way to Maracaibo Prison, and found work as a laborer on a farm. The following year, he was pardoned.

Sometime later, he joined the liberal army of José Tadeo Monagas, who fought against the landlords. In 1849, he captured Páez and took him, chained, to Caracas. In 1851, he was promoted to colonel. But the defeat of the landowners was temporary, and Zamora was exiled to Curaçao. In October 1858, the Patriotic Meeting was formed in Willemstad and they began a rebellion against the general Juan Crisóstomo Falcón, Zamora's brother in law.

Federal War 
On 23 February 1859, as part of the Federal War, he disembarked from Curaçao to La Vela de Coro. He was named Chief Operator of the West, and made Coro a federal state (25 February 1859) and organized a provisional government in Venezuela (26 February 1859).

On 23 March, he triumphed in the El Palito meeting, from which he planned to move toward the western plains. He took San Felipe on 28 March and reorganized the province as a federal entity with the name Yaracuy. On 10 December 1859, the Battle of Santa Inés occurred, in which Zamora defeated the Centralist army; this action was considered central to the process of the Federal War and a testimony to Zamora's exceptional qualities as a troop driver. After Santa Inés, Zamora moved toward the center of the country with 3,000 infantry and 300 cavalry, through Barinas and Portuguesa, but before approaching Caracas, he decided to attack the city of San Carlos, whose main square was defended by Major Benito Figueredo, with 700 men.

During the preliminary actions for taking the square on 10 January 1860, Zamora was shot in the head, which caused his death. The cause of his death remains a mystery. Some say that the bullet came from his own side, obeying orders from Falcón and Guzmán Blanco. His unexpected passing changed the positive direction of the war for the Federalists, and resulted in a loss. For many, he was considered the most important popular leader of 19th-century Venezuela, and his remains rest in the National Pantheon in Caracas.

Legacy 
In 2001, a new land reform program, under President Hugo Chávez, Mission Zamora, was named after Ezequiel Zamora.

Ezequiel Zamora was portrayed by Alexander Solórzano in the 2009 film Zamora: tierra y hombres libres.

References 

 Biography at venezuelatuya.com (in Spanish)

External links 

1817 births
1860 deaths
People from Cúa
Venezuelan people of Canarian descent
Great Liberal Party of Venezuela politicians
Venezuelan soldiers
People of the Federal War
Burials at the National Pantheon of Venezuela